The following is a list of films originally produced and/or distributed theatrically by Metro-Goldwyn-Mayer and released between 1924 and 1929.

See also 
 Lists of Metro-Goldwyn-Mayer films

References 

1924-1929
American films by studio
1920s in American cinema
Lists of 1920s films